Jan Krajíček (born November 8, 1971) is a Czech former professional ice hockey defenceman.

Krajíček played in the Czech Extraliga for HC Zlín, HC Slezan Opava and HC Slavia Praha. He also played in the Slovak Extraliga for HK 36 Skalica and in the Elite Ice Hockey League for the Newcastle Vipers and the Nottingham Panthers.

He is the older brother of former NHL player Lukáš Krajíček.

References

External links

1971 births
Living people
Czech ice hockey defencemen
Edinburgh Capitals players
SHK Hodonín players
LHK Jestřábi Prostějov players
Newcastle Vipers players
Nottingham Panthers players
Sportspeople from Prostějov
HC ZUBR Přerov players
Romford Raiders players
HK 36 Skalica players
HC Slavia Praha players
HC Slezan Opava players
Slough Jets players
Swindon Wildcats players
PSG Berani Zlín players
Czech expatriate ice hockey players in Slovakia
Czech expatriate ice hockey people
Czech expatriate sportspeople in England
Expatriate ice hockey players in England
Czech expatriate sportspeople in Scotland
Expatriate ice hockey players in Scotland